Hampyeong No clan was one of the Korean clans. Their Bon-gwan was in Hampyeong County, South Jeolla Province. According to the research in 2005, the number of Hampyeong No clan was 35231. The name of Lu came from China. The name was made when Bo Qin was appointed as Lu and called himself as Lu.  who was a loyal family of Qi during Warring States period era founded Gija Joseon with Gija when  conquered Korea.

See also 
 Korean clan names of foreign origin

References

External links